Mifflin Township is a township in Dauphin County, Pennsylvania, United States. The population was 816 at the 2020 census, an increase over the figure of 662 tabulated in 2000.

History
Mifflin Township was named for Thomas Mifflin, first governor of Pennsylvania.

The Dauphin County Bridge No. 27 was listed on the National Register of Historic Places in 1993.

Geography
Mifflin Township is in northern Dauphin County, bordered to the north by Northumberland County. Mahantango Creek, a west-flowing tributary of the Susquehanna River, forms the northern border of the township. The borough of Berrysburg is in the eastern part of the township, and the borough of Pillow is in the northeastern corner; both boroughs are separate municipalities from the township.

Demographics

As of the census of 2000, there were 662 people, 222 households, and 182 families residing in the township.  The population density was 43.1 people per square mile (16.7/km).  There were 231 housing units at an average density of 15.0/sq mi (5.8/km).  The racial makeup of the township was 98.34% White, 1.21% African American, 0.15% Native American, 0.15% from other races, and 0.15% from two or more races.

There were 222 households, out of which 39.6% had children under the age of 18 living with them, 73.9% were married couples living together, 4.1% had a female householder with no husband present, and 18.0% were non-families. 15.8% of all households were made up of individuals, and 8.6% had someone living alone who was 65 years of age or older.  The average household size was 2.98 and the average family size was 3.34.

In the township the population was spread out, with 31.6% under the age of 18, 7.4% from 18 to 24, 27.8% from 25 to 44, 22.4% from 45 to 64, and 10.9% who were 65 years of age or older.  The median age was 36 years. For every 100 females, there were 106.2 males.  For every 100 females age 18 and over, there were 103.1 males.

The median income for a household in the township was $39,620, and the median income for a family was $43,438. Males had a median income of $31,083 versus $24,643 for females. The per capita income for the township was $15,945.  About 5.5% of families and 11.9% of the population were below the poverty line, including 20.5% of those under age 18 and 10.8% of those age 65 or over.

References

Harrisburg–Carlisle metropolitan statistical area
Townships in Dauphin County, Pennsylvania
Townships in Pennsylvania